Aulogastromyia is a genus of small flies of the family Lauxaniidae.

Species
A. anisodactyla (Loew, 1845)
A. rohdendorfi Shatalkin, 1993

References

Lauxaniidae
Schizophora genera
Taxa named by Friedrich Georg Hendel